Daniil Gavrilovich Barchenkov (17 December 1917 – 30 May 1953) was a Soviet fighter pilot during World War II who was awarded the title Hero of the Soviet Union. A flying ace, his final tally at the end of the war stands at an estimated 19 shootdowns.

References

1917 births
1953 deaths
People from Rudnyansky District, Smolensk Oblast
People from Orshansky Uyezd
Russian aviators
Heroes of the Soviet Union
Soviet World War II flying aces
Victims of aviation accidents or incidents in the Soviet Union
Recipients of the Order of Lenin
Recipients of the Order of the Red Banner
Recipients of the Order of Alexander Nevsky